This is a list of notable Vietnamese Americans.

To be included in this list, the person must have a Wikipedia article showing they are Vietnamese American, or must have independent reliable source references showing they are Vietnamese American and are notable.

Arts and entertainment

Actors and actresses

David Huynh – actor known for his role in The Sinner
James Duval – actor, mother is of Vietnamese-French descent
Eileen Fogarty  – actor, writer, and producer
Lance Krall – actor and star of FREE RADIO on VH1
Hiep Thi Le – actress known for role in Heaven & Earth, third film in director Oliver Stone's Vietnam trilogy
Jeannie Mai – makeup artist, fashion expert, actress, TV personality and model
Dustin Nguyen – actor
 Olivia Munn – former model, Daily Show correspondent and actress of X-Men: Apocalypse and Mortdecai fame
Maggie Q – former model and actress in Mission: Impossible III
Tiffany Pham – actress, model, author, and entrepreneur 
Ke Huy Quan – actor and stunt choreographer
Rosie Tran – writer, actress, and comedian
Thuy Trang – actress known for role as the Yellow Power Ranger in the series Power Rangers
Kathy Uyen – actress, producer, and writer
Kieu Chinh – actress, producer, and writer
Xanthe Huynh – anime English voice actress
Ali Wong – actress, comedian, and writer, known for Always Be My Maybe
Lana Condor – actress, known Lara Jean in To All the Boys
La Thoại Tân – actor
Kelly Marie Tran – actress, known for Rose Tico in Star Wars: The Last Jedi and Raya in Raya and the Last Dragon
Hong Chau – actress, known for roles in Downsizing and Watchmen.
Levy Tran – actress and model, known for her role in MacGyver
Loan Chabanol – actress
Tram-Anh Tran – actress, known for her role in Ghostwriter
Patti Harrison – actress, writer and comedian, known for her role in Shrill and Together Together
Johnny Trí Nguyễn - action choreographer, film actor, martial artist

Anchors and reporters

Betty Nguyen – CBS Early Morning News anchor, former CNN anchor
Mary Nguyen – Award-winning reporter; first Asian-American Miss Teenage America 
Leyna Nguyen – Emmy Award-winning anchor
Vicky Nguyen – NBC Investigate and Consumer Correspondent
Thuy Vu – Emmy award-winning anchor and reporter for CBS-5 Television in San Francisco

Directors
Tim Dang – theatre director and actor. Former artistic director at the Asian American theatre company, East West Players.
Doan Hoang – director and producer of the PBS documentary film about a family in the Vietnam War, Oh, Saigon
Steve Nguyen – director and film producer
Linh Nga – director and film producer
Michael Dougherty – director/writer of Trick 'r Treat
Ham Tran – director of Journey from the Fall
Derek Nguyen – writer/director of The Housemaid (2016 film)
Timothy Linh Bui - filmmaker, film producer, and screenwriter
Tony Bui - film director

Dance groups
Jabbawockeez
 Jeff "Phi" Nguyen
Poreotics – America's Best Dance Crew season 5 champions
 Matthew "Dumbo" Vinh Quoc Nguyen
 Charles Viet Nguyen
 Can Trong "Candy" Nguyen

Musicians 
Cuong Vu – Grammy award-winning jazz trumpeter and vocalist
Tyga – Vietnamese and Jamaican rapper signed to Young Money and Cash Money Records
keshi (Casey Luong) – singer, songwriter, producer, and multi-instrumentalist who gained popularity from songs "like i need u" and "2 soon"
Nguyễn Cao Kỳ Duyên, MC, singer
Don Hồ, singer
Bao Vo, musician, singer-songwriter, composer

Artists and others
Daniel K. Winn - Painter/Sculptor
Binh Danh – photographer
Thuc Doan Nguyen – writer
Chloe Dao – fashion designer/winner of television show Project Runway
Dat Phan – comedian, winner of first Last Comic Standing
Jonas Bevacqua – adopted Vietnamese American fashion designer, creator of urbanwear LRG
Michelle Phan – YouTube beauty guru
Linda Le – cosplayer and model
Hung Huynh – chef, Top Chef season 3 winner
Tom Vu – infomercial icon, professional poker player and real estate investor
Tila Tequila – popular woman on MySpace; starred on her own MTV show; appeared in FHM magazine, current president of TVes network in Venezuela.
Christine Ha – first blind contestant on MasterChef and the winner of its third season in 2012
Phong Bui – artist, writer, independent curator; co-founder, editor-in-chief, and publisher of The Brooklyn Rail, a monthly arts, culture, and politics journal in New York
Karrueche Tran – American model and actress
Truong Tran – poet, visual artist, teacher
Ken Hoang – Survivor contestant and professional video game player
Tai Trang – Survivor contestant
Ocean Vuong – Award-winning American novelist, poet, and essayist
Tom Cross – Academy Award-winning film editor
Bao Phi - artist, writer and community activist
Quan Barry - poet and novelist
Nai Bonet - belly-dancer, singer and film actress
Nikita Dragun – YouTuber, make-up artist, and model

Business
 Johnny Dang – notable Vietnamese American jeweler
 Trung Dung – founder of OnDisplay, sold to Vignette Corporation in 2000 for $1.8 billion
 Frank Jao – pioneer behind Little Saigon, Westminster, California, and the Asian Garden Mall
 Eric Ly – co-founder of LinkedIn, a social networking service 
 Bill Nguyen – founder of onebox.com and lala.com, sold for $850 million and $80 million respectively
 David Tran – founder of Huy Fong Foods, maker of Sriracha Chili Sauce
 Kieu Hoang – pharmaceutical billionaire, CEO of RAAS, Inc (USA) and Vice Chairman of Shanghai RAAS Blood Products, China

Literature and journalism
Aimee Phan – author of We Should Never Meet
Andrew X. Pham – author of Catfish and Mandala: A Two-Wheeled Voyage Through the Landscape and Memory of Vietnam (1999)
Chau Nguyen – news anchor; first Vietnamese-American to be awarded a regional Emmy Award
Đoàn Văn Toại – author of The Vietnamese Gulag
Huỳnh Sanh Thông – author known for An Anthology of Vietnamese Poems: From the Eleventh through the Twentieth Centuries
Jenna Lê – poet and physician; author of "A History of the Cetacean-American Diaspora"
Kien Nguyen – author of The Unwanted, a Memoir of Childhood
Lan Cao – former attorney and current law professor, author of Monkey Bridge
Le Ly Hayslip  – author of When Heaven and Earth Changed Places, which was turned into a motion picture (Heaven & Earth) directed by Oliver Stone
Le Thi Diem Thuy – award-winning-author of the novel The Gangster We Are All Looking For
Mong-Lan – college professor and author of Song of the Cicadas
Monique Truong – author of The Book of Salt
Andrew Lam – writer and journalist Author of "Perfume Dreams: Reflections On The Vietnamese Diaspora"
Nguyễn Chí Thiện – poet and winner of international poetry award in 1985
Nguyen Do – poet, editor and translator; co-author of Black Dog, Black Night Contemporary Vietnamese Poetry (2008) and Beyond the Court Gate: Selected Poems of Nguyen Trai (2010)
Nguyen Qui Duc – essayist and radio producer and author of Where the Ashes Are: The Odyssey of a Vietnamese Family
Lê Xuân Nhuận – author of Vietnamese poems; human rights activist; author of Poems by Selected Vietnamese
Ocean Vuong – poet and 2016 Whiting Award Winner
Quang X. Pham – author; founder of Lathian Systems, a pharmaceutical promotions company
Stephanie Trong – Jane executive editor
Trinh T. Minh-ha – author, post-colonial scholar, and filmmaker
Ut Huynh Cong – photographer; first Vietnamese American to win the Pulitzer Prize for Spot News Photography (1973) and the World Press Award
Viet Thanh Nguyen – author of The Sympathizer, the 2016 Pulitzer Prize for Fiction
Vu Tran – author of Dragonfish
Linh Dinh – poet, writer, translator, and photographer
Do Nguyen Mai – poet and author of Ghosts Still Walking
Thanh Bui – editor-in-chief, ASN magazine, founder of Shiba Rescue Society
Kimberly Nguyễn – poet and author of ghosts in the stalks and a forthcoming collection in fall 
Soleil Ho – San Francisco Chronicle’s Restaurant Critic, writer, podcaster, and chef

Military

Viet Xuan Luong – Major General, US Army Japan 
Lapthe Flora – Major General, Combined Joint Task Force – Horn of Africa 
 William H. Seely III – Major General, US Marine Corps; Director of Marine Corps Intelligence; American father/Vietnamese mother.
Quang X. Pham – first Vietnamese American to earn naval aviator's wings in the US Marine Corps; author and politician
TBD

Politics and law

Federal
Joseph Cao – first Vietnamese-American Congressman, represented Louisiana's 2nd congressional district from 2009 until 2011 (Republican)
Viet D. Dinh – former United States Assistant Attorney General; drafted the USA Patriot Act
John Quoc Duong – President George W. Bush's appointee as executive director of the White House Initiative on Asian Americans and Pacific Islanders (Republican)
Stephanie Murphy – Vietnamese-American Congresswoman representing Florida's 7th congressional district from 2017 until present (Democratic)
Jacqueline Nguyen – U.S. circuit judge; first Vietnamese-American federal judge; first Asian-American woman to sit on the federal appellate court
Mina Nguyen – Deputy Assistant Secretary for Business Affairs and Public Liaison at the US Treasury Department
J. Peter Pham, United States Special Envoy for the Sahel Region of Africa, first Vietnamese American with the rank of ambassador.
Dat Tran — Acting United States Secretary of Veterans Affairs

California state legislators
Tyler Diep – California State Assemblyman (Republican)
Janet Nguyen – California State Senator (Republican)
Tri Ta – California State Assemblyman (Republican)
Van Tran – first Vietnamese American elected to any state legislature; California State Assemblyman (Republican)

Other state legislators
Bee Nguyen – Georgia state representative (Democratic)
Joe Nguyen – Washington State Senator (Democratic)
Tram Nguyen – Massachusetts State Representative (Democratic)
Dean Tran – first Vietnamese-American elected to the Massachusetts Legislature (Republican)
Kathy Tran – Virginia State Delegate
My-Linh Thai – Washington State Representative (Democratic)
Hubert Vo – Texas state representative (Democratic)

Local government
Andrew Do – Orange County, California Board of Supervisors (Republican)
Tony Lam – first Vietnamese-American im any elected office; Westminster, California city council (Republican)
Madison Nguyen – San Jose City Council member and Vice Mayor of City of San Jose, California (Democratic)
John Tran – first Vietnamese-American to be Mayor of any city; Mayor of Rosemead, California (Democratic)

Other
Lan Cao – law professor, novelist
Bùi Diễm – one of the last Vietnamese ambassadors to the United States during the final phase of the Vietnam War
Kok Ksor – president of the Montagnard Foundation, Inc.
Amanda Nguyen – President and Founder of Rise (non-governmental organization), a non-profit that works to implement a sexual assault survivors' bill of rights.
Huu Chanh Nguyen – founder and former Prime Minister of the Government of Free Vietnam

Science and education

Kathy Pham – computer scientist and product leader; founding product and engineering member at the United States Digital Service at the White House, Nguoi Viet 40 under 40.
Han T. Dinh – Director of Vehicle Engineering, United States Postal Service; winner of 2006 White House "Closing of Circle Award"
Bui Tuong Phong – computer graphics pioneer; inventor of Phong reflection model and Phong shading interpolation method
Duy-Loan Le – prominent Texas Instruments engineer
Trang Thach Hickman – public health professional and J. William Fulbright Scholar
Eugene H. Trinh – NASA astronaut, first Vietnamese-American to travel into outer space
 Hồ Thành Việt –  founder of VNI Software Co., California
Jane Luu – astronomer, co-discoverer of Kuiper Belt and many asteroids
Nguyễn Xuân Vinh – professor of aerospace engineering, University of Michigan; first Vietnamese to receive the [[Dirk Brouwer Award (A
Anh Duong Nguyet – responsible for the creation of the thermobaric weapon
 Trịnh Xuân Thuận – author of The Birth of the Universe; astrophysicist; professor of astronomy at the University of Virginia
 Tuan Vo-Dinh – inventor, professor and Director of the Fitzpatrick Institute for Photonics of Duke University; ranked No. 43 on a list of the world's top 100 living geniuses
Xuong Nguyen-Huu – biology professor, University of California; pioneer in AIDS research; invented the x-ray multiwire area detector
Đàm Thanh Sơn – theoretical physicist, University Professor at University of Chicago, member of National Academy of Sciences
Van H. Vu – Professor of Mathematics at Yale University
Ngô Bảo Châu – Professor of Mathematics at University of Chicago; Fields Medal winner
Trần Duy Trác - Professor of Electrical and Computer Engineering at Johns Hopkins University
SonBinh Nguyen – Professor of Chemistry at Northwestern University; Highly Cited Researcher
Thuc-Quyen Nguyen – Professor of Chemistry at University of California, Santa Barbara; Highly Cited Researcher
Chi Van Dang – Professor; Scientific Director at Ludwig Cancer Research; Former Director of the Abramson Cancer Center at the University of Pennsylvania Perelman School of Medicine; member of the National Academy of Medicine (Institute of Medicine), American Academy of Arts & Sciences.

Sports and games

Baseball 
Danny Graves – MLB baseball player
Jim Parque – only left-handed pitcher on the Olympics baseball team that won a bronze medal in Atlanta in 1996
Tommy Pham – MLB baseball player

Fighting sports 
Cung Le – kickboxer and MMA fighter; undefeated San Shou champion; former Strikeforce champion, actor and coach
Thanh Le - former ONE Featherweight World Champion
Dat Nguyen – World Ranked Professional boxer
Nam Phan – MMA fighter in the UFC
Ben Nguyen – MMA fighter, fighting also in the UFC
Bi Nguyen – Survivor contestant and MMA fighter, formerly fought in ONE Championship

Poker 
Men Nguyen – professional poker player; as of 2010, his total live tournament winnings exceeded $9,700,000
Qui Nguyen (poker player) – 2016 World Series of Poker Main Event Champion
Scotty Nguyen – professional poker player
David Pham – professional poker, won two World Series of Poker bracelets and has made seven final tables at the World Poker Tour
J.C. Tran – professional poker player; as of 2010, his total live tournament winnings amounted to $7,996,635
Mimi Tran – professional poker player; as of 2008, her total live tournament winnings exceeded $1,400,000
Running

 Mimi Tran

Other sports 
Howard Bach – badminton player, former world champion (2005)
Catherine Mai Lan Fox – Olympic swimmer with two gold medals
Leta Lindley – LPGA Tour golfer
Brandon Nakashima – ATP Tour tennis player of Japanese and Vietnamese descent
Lee Nguyen – Major League Soccer soccer player, currently plays for the New England Revolution
Dat Nguyen – NFL football player, Dallas Cowboys assistant linebackers and defensive quality control coach
Don Nguyen – pro skateboarder
Minh Thai – first world Rubik's Cube champion (1982) at 22.95 seconds; author of the book The Winning Solution
Amy Tran – field hockey player
Thai-Son Kwiatkowski – men's professional tennis player
Joe Walters – professional lacrosse player
Jaylin Williams - NBA power forward

Religion
 Thích Thiên-Ân – Buddhist monk, meditation teacher and founder of International Buddhist Meditation Center in the Koreatown section of Los Angeles
 Luong Kim Dinh – Catholic priest, scholar and philosopher
 Dominic Mai Thanh Lương – auxiliary bishop of the Roman Catholic Diocese of Orange
 Thomas Nguyễn Thái Thành – auxiliary bishop of the Roman Catholic Diocese of Orange

References

Vietnamese Americans

Vietnamese
Vietnamese